Louis Sussmann-Hellborn (March 20, 1828 – August 15, 1908), also spelled Ludwig Sussman Hellborn, was a German sculptor, painter, art collector and contractor.

Life 
Louis Sussmann-Hellborn was born in Berlin.

Louis Sussmann-Hellborn received his training as a sculptor at the Berlin Academy of Arts. He traveled to study in France, Belgium and England. He lived In Rome from 1852 to 1856. The first major exhibition of his works was organized in Berlin in 1856. His villa at Tiergarten was one of the most representative buildings of the district and made him famous within the educated society of Berlin. In 1875 Arnold Bocklin bought Sussmann Hellborn's painting "Meeresidylle" ("Sea Idyll", aka "Triton and Nereid") for 10,000 marks (it was later at the National Gallery, and it's missing since 1945).

He was one of the founders of the Royal Museum of Decorative Arts and was also involved in building a sculpture collection at the Royal Museum in Berlin. From 1882 to 1887, Sussmann-Hellborn was head of the Royal Porcelain Manufactory (KPM) in Berlin. Otto Lessing (1846–1912) and he were at that time the only sculptors in the Berlin Association of Architects, which had probably to do with his work as an excellent sculptor.

Louis Sussmann-Hellborn was married to the celebrated beauty Bertha Hellborn.

He died in Berlin and is buried at the Jewish cemetery Schönhauser Allee.

Works (selection) 
 After 1852 to 1856: Italian braid; drunken Faun; Abandoned Psyche, Cupid in arms; boy as candelabra carrier; relief portrait of Edward Magnus, Alter Dorotheenstädtischer and Friedrich Werderscher Berlin cemetery
 1862: Statue of King Frederick II of Brzeg
 1869: Statue of King Frederick II for the ballroom of the Red City Hall (destroyed) statue of King Friedrich Wilhelm III for the ballroom of the Red Town Hall
 1875: The German song (an allegorical group of maidens called "folk song" and "art song"), Berlin-Tiergarten (a copy of Hans Starcke; original cast in the socket building of the National Monument for the Liberation Wars on the Kreuzberg)
 1878: Sleeping Beauty, Old National Gallery; Lutenist, Old National Gallery.
 1881: Hans Holbein's seated figure, Martin-Gropius-Bau in Berlin (heavily damaged), seated figure of Peter Vischer, Martin-Gropius-Bau in Berlin (severely damaged).
 Numerous sculptural works.
 Numerous designs for decorative enamel work for the company Ravené & Sussman-Hellborn.

See also
 Volksgesang, Tiergarten

References 
 Ulrich Thieme, Felix Becker, Hans Vollmer u.a. (Eds).Allgemeines Lexikon der bildenden Künstler Seemann Verlag Leipzig (reprint of original edition, Leipzig, 1999).
 Siegmund Kanz Nelson (ed.):.Juden im deutschen KulturbereichBerlin 1959, p. 99.
 Ethos & Pathos – Die Berliner Bildhauerschule 1786–1914. Katalog und Begleitband zur Ausstellung Berlin 1990.
 Rosemarie Köhler, Ulrich Kratz-Whan.Der Jüdische Friedhof Schönhauser AlleeHaude & Spener, Berlin 1992, p. 177-178
 City Foundation Berlin (Ed.), edited by Knut Brehm, Bernd Gottschalk, and Jörg Ernsting Wolfgang Kuhn:Katalog der Skulpturen 1780-1920(letter font), Cologne 2003.
 Dagmar Frings and Jörg Kuhn:Die Borchardts. Auf den Spuren einer Berliner Familie.Hentrich & Hentrich, Berlin 2011, p. 29, p. 11 n. 78, p. 137
 Nationalgalerie Berlin – Bestandskatalog der Skulpturen2006,

External links
  Brief Biography (in German)

1828 births
1908 deaths
German sculptors
German male sculptors
19th-century German painters
19th-century German male artists
German male painters
20th-century German painters
20th-century German male artists
20th-century sculptors
19th-century sculptors